Inkilltambo, Inquilltambo, Inquiltambo or Inkill Tampu (possibly from Quechua inkill terrain where plants are cultivated, especially ornamental ones, tampu inn)  is an archaeological site in Peru. It is situated in the Cusco Region, Cusco Province, San Sebastián District.

References 

Archaeological sites in Peru
Archaeological sites in Cusco Region